The vulval vestibule (also known as the vulvar vestibule or vestibule of vagina) is the part of the vulva between the labia minora. On the inside, the urinary meatus and the vaginal opening open to the vestibule, while the outer edge is marked by Hart's line, named after David Berry Hart.

It represents the distal end of the urogenital sinus of the embryo.

Structure
Structures opening in the vulval vestibule are the urethra, vagina, Bartholin's glands, and Skene's ducts.

The external urethral orifice is placed about 25–30 millimetres (1–1.2 in) behind the clitoris and immediately in front of that of the vagina; it usually assumes the form of a short, sagittal cleft with slightly raised margins. Nearby are the openings of the Skene's ducts.

The vaginal orifice is a median slit below and behind the opening of the urethra; its size varies inversely with that of the hymen.

To the left and right of the vulval vestibule are the labia minora. Anterior to it are the clitoral hood, frenulum clitoridis, and the clitoral glans. Posterior to it is the posterior commissure of the labia minora and the frenulum of labia minora.

The sides of the vestibule are visible as Hart's line on the inside of the inner lips. Hart's line is the outer edge of the area and marks the change from vulvar skin to the smoother transitional skin of the vulva.

Clinical significance
The prevalence of pain at the vulvar vestibule is relatively common. A study by the University of Michigan found that about 28% of women have experienced vulvar vestibular pain in the past, and about 8% had the pain in the last 6 months.

References

Vagina